The following is a list of squads for each nation competing at the 2010 European Women's Handball Championship in Norway and Denmark. The tournament started on 7 December and the final took place in Herning on 19 December.

Each nation had to submit an initial squad of 28 players by 3 November 2010, but 12 of them became reserves when the final squad of 16 players was announced the day before the tournament starts.

Appearances, goals and ages as of tournament start, 7 December 2010.

Group A

Head coach: Jan Pytlick

Head coach: Radu Voina

Head coach: Duško Milić

Head coach: Jorge Dueñas

Group B

Head coach: Vladimir Canjuga

Head coach: Júlíus Jónasson

Head coach: Dragan Adžić

Head coach: Yevgeni Trefilov

Group C

Head coach: Rainer Osmann

Head coach: Henk Groener

Head coach: Per Johansson

Head coach: Leonid Yevtushenko

Group D

Head coach: Olivier Krumbholz

Head coach: Eszter Mátéfi

Head coach: Thorir Hergeirsson

Head coach: Ivica Rimanić

Notes and references

External links
Official Squad List

2010 European Women's Handball Championship
European Handball Championship squads